Fintry is a small riverside village in Stirlingshire, central Scotland.

Landscape

The village of Fintry sits on the strath of the Endrick Water in a valley between the Campsie Fells and the Fintry Hills.

The name Fintry is said to have derived from the Old Gaalic for "Fair Land" and is designated as a Local Landscape Area (LLA) (formally called a Special Landscape Area or Area of Great Landscape Value).

History

Neolithic & Bronze age

There is evidence of people living in the area as early at the Bronze age, up to 4,000 years ago.
Todholes Cairn, Fintry Hills - double ring cairn of the late Neolithic/earlier Bronze Age (3500 to 4500 years old)
Machar/Waterhead Stones - pair of neolithic standing stones

Old Fintry

"Old" Fintry was formed around the Church area or Clachan of Fintry in the early 13th century.

Culcreuch Castle was also built around this period, in 1296, and was the historic seat of the chiefs of the Galbraith clan until 1624 when a series of scandals lost them their status under Scots Law.

New Fintry

The small industrial ‘new town’ of Fintry (or "Newton of Fintry") developed north-west of the original clachan following the establishment of
the Culcreuch cotton spinning mill by Peter Spiers in 1795. The mill and two small settlements were recorded in the mid-eighteenth century. the village had retained examples of former mill workers’ housing alongside traditional buildings from the later eighteenth and turn of the nineteenth centuries.

Modern Fintry

Fintry resident Sir Walter Menzies MP built the Menzies Hall to celebrate the coming of age of his son, James, in 1907. The hall is still used as a village hall and hosts events, and clubs, including Fintry Amateur Dramatic Society.

To safeguard the settlement’s distinctive historical form and character Fintry has been designated a Conservation Area by Stirling Council. Fintry Conservation Area is centred on its long Main Street, set out on the south bank of the river across the Fintry
Bridge from the original Culcreuch mill site. 150 of the 700 strong population living within the Fintry Conservation area.

Facilities

Public services
There is a primary school in the village with a nursery class annex. Fintry is within the catchment area of Balfron High School, for which a school bus is provided.
Public transport is provided by the Stirling Council Demand Responsive Transport "Taxi" Service. There is a village hall, The Menzies Hall, home to Fintry Amateur Dramatic Society.

Businesses
Until early 2020, Culcreuch Castle, functioned as a hotel, visitor attraction, and popular wedding venue. In late 2019, the US based owner made the decision to close the venue, and it has remained empty since.

The village has a Sports Club, which includes a 4-rink indoor bowling hall. The rugby pitches adjacent are home to Strathendrick Rugby Football Club.

The village pub, The Fintry Inn, closed its doors at the start of the COVID-19 pandemic. It reopened on Friday 3 June 2022, after being bought by a local family. The redecorated pub is also home to a new micro-brewery, Mosaik Brewing.

The Fintry Inn will also feature a new off-sales shop, ‘The Unchartered Shop’ offering specialist whisky, wine and gin.

Fintry Kirk

The parish of Fintry is first mentioned in 1207 and was originally dedicated to St Modan and was under control of the Collegiate Church of the Blessed Virgin Mary in Dunbarton. The only pre-Reformation vicar known by name is Stephen Culross in 1539.

From 1560 Fintry shared a minister with neighbouring Strathblane and Campsie, this being Mr John Stoddart who was assisted by a reader, George Watson. However, complaint was made to the Privy Council that a James Galbraith of Kilcreuch had commandeered the manse and glebe. The same James Galbraith is noted as the main local force in removing the Catholic presence from the parish, and clearly thought he deserved their property for his actions.

In 1634 the village had its first university trained minister: David Adamson who received an MA from Glasgow University in 1619 and served the parish until 1659. In January 1641 Adamson publicly rebuked a group of parishioners for drinking on the Lord's Day at the house of James Provand. As the time in question was 10pm on a Saturday this tells us that the controls limiting activities on the Sabbath ran from sunset to sunset rather than midnight to midnight. This was normal prior to the widespread use of clocks.

In May 1642 Jonet Miller was found guilty of "banning and cursing" and had to pay a fine of 4 merks and spend 4 hours in the public jougs. In January 1643 a Marion Ewing confessed to going to "Christ's Well" at Menteith with other persons, and collected water "to cast on her cattel": despite the well's name, this supersticious activity was frowned upon. A similar incident happened in 1649 involving a David Ewing who brought water to cast on his child from Strathfellen's Well. His sister-in-law Margaret Kessen went with him to get water for her husband's sores, it being bad luck to carry water for two tasks. They were required to spend three Sundays in the pillory, bare-footed and bare-headed.

In 1654 Adamson organised a new school in the parish to combat the ignorance of the children, but noted the difficulty of some children crossing the River Endrick to reach the school. This addressed "a generation without knowledge of God". He introduced a rule for couples getting married that each would have to demonstrate knowledge of the Bible before they could be married.

Fintry is a Church of Scotland Parish in the Presbytery of Stirling. The kirk is located to the East of the village. The parish minister for Fintry is shared with Balfron with the Manse located there.

Democracy
The village is within the local government council area of Stirling and is in the Stirling constituency for both the Scottish and Westminster Parliaments.

The 2011 census results report that Fintry and the surrounding rural area had a population of 717.

Elected representatives 

Member of Parliament (Stirling): Alyn Smith
Member of Scottish Parliament (Stirling): Evelyn Tweed
Members of Scottish Parliament (Mid Scotland and Fife Scottish regional list): Liz Smith, Dean Lockhart, Alex Rowley, Alexander Stewart, Murdo Fraser, Claire Baker, Mark Ruskell
Stirling Council Council Ward (Forth and Endrick): Alistair Berrill (Conservative), Jane Hutchison (Conservative), Robert Davies (Independent)

Notable people
Sir Daniel Macnee (artist) 1806-1882
Sir Walter Menzies MP (politician) 1856-1913
Tom Johnston MP (politician) 1881-1965
Victor Carin (actor) - 1933-1981
Eric McCredie (musician) 1945-2007 
Right Hon Julian Smith MP (politician) 1971-
Stewart Campbell (sportsman) - 1972-

References

External links

 Fintry Community Council
 Fintry Development Trust

Villages in Stirling (council area)